Piz Sarsura Pitschen (3,134 m) (Romansh: "little Piz Sarsura") is a mountain of the Albula Alps, located west of Zernez in the canton of Graubünden. It lies north of Piz Sarsura, on the range between the Val Grialetsch and the Val Sarsura.

References

External links
 Piz Sarsura Pitschen on Hikr

Mountains of the Alps
Mountains of Graubünden
Mountains of Switzerland